Souk Sidi Boumendil  is one of the popular souks of the medina of Tunis.

Location 
It is located near the eastern entrance of the medina of Tunis in the Sidi Boumendil Street.
It extends from Sidi El Bechir place to Spain Street and La Commission Street.

Products 
The souk is specialized in selling products from China and Eastern Asia. These products are known for their low quality and cheap price.

Notes and references 

Sidi Boumendil